The Cucamonga Wilderness is a federally designated wilderness area located in the eastern San Gabriel Mountains, in San Bernardino County, Southern California.

The  wilderness is managed by the United States Forest Service in Angeles National Forest and San Bernardino National Forest

See also
 Cucamonga Peak
 Ontario Peak
 Telegraph Peak (California)

References

External links
 
 
 

San Gabriel Mountains
Angeles National Forest
San Bernardino National Forest
Protected areas of San Bernardino County, California
Wilderness areas of California